Bagneux may refer to:

Communes in France
Bagneux, Aisne
Bagneux, Allier
Bagneux, Hauts-de-Seine
Bagneux, Indre
Bagneux, Marne
Bagneux, Meurthe-et-Moselle
Bagneux-la-Fosse, Aube

Other
Bagneux British Cemetery, département of the Somme
Cimetière parisien de Bagneux